Anton Robert Leinweber (7 February 1845, Böhmisch Leipa – 21 December 1921, Munich) was a Bohemian German painter and illustrator; known for his Orientalist and Biblical scenes.

Biography
His father was a secondary-school teacher. After completing his local education, he went to Prague and Vienna to study engineering, but never completed his courses.

After this period, he went to the Academy of Fine Arts, Munich, to study painting; followed by studies in Prague and at the Dresden Academy of Fine Arts, where his principal instructor was Julius Hübner.

He spent many years in North Africa; primarily Tunisia. Together with Philipp Grot Johann and Hermann Vogel, he created illustrations for Grimm's Fairy Tales. He also produced illustrations for a deluxe edition of the Bible.

Sources
 Helge Dvorak: Biographisches Lexikon der Deutschen Burschenschaft. Vol. II: Künstler. Winter, Heidelberg 2018, pgs.446–447
 Biographical data @ AbART

External links

More works by Leinweber @ Meisterdrucke

1845 births
1921 deaths
19th-century German painters
19th-century German male artists
German illustrators
German orientalists
German Bohemian people
People from Česká Lípa
20th-century German painters
20th-century German male artists